Chad Robb Carvin (born April 13, 1974) is an American former competition swimmer and Olympic medalist.  At the 2000 Summer Olympics in Sydney, Australia, he earned a silver medal by swimming for the second-place U.S. team in the preliminary heats of  the men's 4×200-meter freestyle relay.  He also competed in the men's 400-meter freestyle, and finished sixth in the event final with a time of 3:47.58.

Carvin attended the University of Arizona, and swam for the Arizona Wildcats swimming and diving team in National Collegiate Athletic Association (NCAA) competition. He was the 1994 NCAA Champion in the 500-yard freestyle and 1650-yard freestyle, setting American, US Open, and NCAA records.

See also
 List of Olympic medalists in swimming (men)
 List of University of Arizona people
 List of World Aquatics Championships medalists in swimming (men)
 World record progression 4 × 200 metres freestyle relay

References

1974 births
Living people
American male freestyle swimmers
Arizona Wildcats men's swimmers
World record setters in swimming
Medalists at the FINA World Swimming Championships (25 m)
Olympic silver medalists for the United States in swimming
People from Laguna Hills, California
Swimmers at the 2000 Summer Olympics
World Aquatics Championships medalists in swimming
Medalists at the 2000 Summer Olympics
Goodwill Games medalists in swimming
Competitors at the 2001 Goodwill Games